Bernhard Tritscher (born 25 April 1988) is an Austrian former cross-country skier.

Cross-country skiing results
All results are sourced from the International Ski Federation (FIS).

Olympic Games

World Championships

World Cup

Season standings

References

1988 births
Cross-country skiers at the 2014 Winter Olympics
Cross-country skiers at the 2018 Winter Olympics
Living people
Olympic cross-country skiers of Austria
Austrian male cross-country skiers
Tour de Ski skiers
People from Zell am See
Sportspeople from Salzburg (state)
21st-century Austrian people